Ya vse znayu ('I know everything') was a non-partisan Russian language newspaper published in Riga in 1932. P. Merkurov was the editor of the newspaper. Only four issues were published.

References

Publications established in 1932
Publications disestablished in 1932
Defunct newspapers published in Latvia
Mass media in Riga
Russian-language newspapers published in Latvia
1932 establishments in Latvia
1932 disestablishments in Latvia